Two Hearts in Waltz Time is a 1934 British musical romance film directed by Carmine Gallone and Joe May and starring Carl Brisson, Frances Day, Bert Coote and Roland Culver. A composer falls in love with the star of an opera company. The music is by Robert Stolz, originally written for a German version in 1930.

It was made at Nettlefold Studios. The film's sets were designed by the art director Andrew Mazzei. In 1938 the film was adapted into a stage musical entitled Lost Waltz and was mounted by the St. Louis Municipal Opera with soprano Nancy McCord.

Cast 
 Carl Brisson as Carl Hoffman
 Frances Day as Helene Barry
 Bert Coote as Danielli
 Oscar Asche as Herman Greenbaum
 C. Denier Warren as Meyer
 Roland Culver as Freddie
 William Jenkins as Max
 Peter Gawthorne as Mr Joseph
 Valerie Hobson as Susie

References 
Notes

Sources
 Low, Rachael. Filmmaking in 1930s Britain. George Allen & Unwin, 1985.
 Wood, Linda. British Films, 1927–1939. British Film Institute, 1986.

External links 

Films directed by Carmine Gallone
1934 films
British romantic musical films
Films about composers
Films based on operettas
Operetta films
British remakes of German films
Musical film remakes
Films shot at Nettlefold Studios
British black-and-white films
Films with screenplays by Franz Schulz
1930s romantic musical films
Films scored by Robert Stolz
1930s English-language films
1930s British films